James Mayuol Thor is a South Sudanese politician. He was one of six SPLM candidates elected on the party list to the Jonglei State Legislative Assembly in the 2010 election.

References

Living people
Year of birth missing (living people)
Sudan People's Liberation Movement politicians
People from Jonglei State
Place of birth missing (living people)